Anuj Tiwary (born 28 November 1996) is an Indian cricketer. He made his first-class debut for Chhattisgarh in the 2018–19 Ranji Trophy on 22 December 2018.

References

External links
 

1996 births
Living people
Indian cricketers
Chhattisgarh cricketers
Place of birth missing (living people)